Maksym Yosypovych Hrysyo (born 14 May 1996) is a Ukrainian professional footballer who plays as midfielder for Lviv.

Career
Hrysyo is a product of the UFK Lviv School System. He then played for FC Karpaty Lviv in the Ukrainian Premier League Reserves and Under 19 Championship for three seasons.

He made his senior debut for FC Karpaty as a starter against FC Stal Kamianske on 23 July 2016 in the Ukrainian Premier League.

References

External links
Statistics at FFU website (Ukr)

1996 births
Living people
Ukrainian footballers
Association football midfielders
FC Karpaty Lviv players
FC Rukh Lviv players
FC Cherkashchyna players
FC Lviv players
Ukrainian Premier League players
Ukrainian First League players
Ukraine youth international footballers
Ukraine under-21 international footballers
Sportspeople from Lviv Oblast